Hilde may refer to:

Hilde (given name)
Hilde (film), a 2009 German biopic film
MV Hilde, a Kriegsmarine coastal tanker
Tom Hilde (born 1987), Norwegian ski jumper

Characters 
Hilde (Soulcalibur), a character in the Soul series
Hilde Schbeiker, a character in Mobile Suit Gundam Wing
Hilde (7 days), a character in "7 days" mobile game

See also
Hild (disambiguation)
Hilda (disambiguation)